Rene Capo (May 9, 1961 – July 6, 2009) was a judoka from the United States who competed in the 1988 Summer Olympics and the 1996 Summer Olympics. Capo immigrated to the United States from Cuba as a young boy. Though he won several judo championships in high school, Capo took a four-year break from the sport to attend the University of Minnesota. After college, Capo went on to qualify for two United States Olympics teams, could not compete as an alternate in another due to a back injury, and narrowly missed making the 2008 team. In 2008, Capo was diagnosed with lung cancer, which caused his death the following year.

Early life
Capo immigrated to the United States from Pinar del Río, Cuba in 1962, when he was still an infant, and grew up in Hialeah, Florida.  He learned Judo as a member of Florida Judo Kai, under the tutelage of Cuban Champion Reinaldo Montpellier. After graduating from Hialeah-Miami Lakes High School He attended the University of Minnesota, where he played defensive tackle for the Golden Gophers from 1979 to 1982, sharing a team record with four sacks.

Judo career

Amateur competition
At the age of six, Capo competed in his first judo competition, and had won his first tournament by nine. By sixteen, he had become a Grandmaster, and won the Judo high school national championship. By the time of his graduation, Capo had earned a national high school gold medal, and won the United States Senior National title. A classmate recalls how, as a 190-pound junior, Capo pinned Lester Williams, then regarded as possibly the top high school athlete in the nation.

Professional career
After a four-year break from Judo in which he focused on football and college, Capo won a gold medal at the 1987 Pacific Rim Championships. A year later, he upset a number of highly ranked heavyweights at the US Judo Olympic Trials. At the 1988 Summer Olympics in Seoul, Capo finished 19th. Capo qualified as the alternate for the 1992 Summer Olympics, but was unable to compete due to severe neck injury. After having surgery on two vertebrae, he made it to the 1996 Summer Olympics, where he was eliminated the first day. From 2005 to 2007, Capo taught judo at the Jason Morris Judo Center in Glenville. He narrowly missed qualifying for the 2008 Summer Olympics, losing to his own student, Kyle Vashkulat. At the 2008 USA Judo Senior National Championships one month later, Capo placed fifth.

Cancer
In 2008, Capo, a non-smoker, was diagnosed with lung cancer, from which he died on July 6, 2009 in Chicago, Illinois. At the time, he lived in Naperville, Illinois, where he had moved to earn money selling magazine subscriptions to schools.

References

1961 births
2009 deaths
American football defensive tackles
American male judoka
Deaths from cancer in Illinois
Cuban emigrants to the United States
Deaths from lung cancer
Judoka at the 1988 Summer Olympics
Judoka at the 1996 Summer Olympics
Minnesota Golden Gophers football players
Olympic judoka of the United States
Sportspeople from Naperville, Illinois
People from Pinar del Río